Pristostegania is a monotypic moth genus in the family Geometridae described by Warren in 1897. Its single species, Pristostegania trilineata, described by Frederic Moore in 1868, is found in Darjeeling, India.

References

Geometridae
Monotypic moth genera